Nathan Alexander Pearson (born August 20, 1996) is an American professional baseball pitcher for the Toronto Blue Jays of Major League Baseball (MLB).

High school and college
Pearson attended Bishop McLaughlin Catholic High School in Spring Hill, Florida. As a senior he went 9–1 with a 1.75 earned run average (ERA) and 117 strikeouts and hit .318 with nine home runs and 30 runs batted in (RBI). After graduating, Pearson attended Florida International University (FIU) where he played college baseball for the FIU Panthers. He made 19 appearances with one start, going 1–1 with a 2.70 ERA and 33 strikeouts. After one year at FIU, he transferred to the College of Central Florida. In his first year at Central Florida, he had a 1.56 ERA and 118 strikeouts and was named the JUCO Pitcher of the Year by Perfect Game.

Professional career

Minor leagues
Pearson was considered one of the top prospects for the 2017 Major League Baseball draft. He was selected 28th overall by the Toronto Blue Jays, and signed on June 28 for a $2.45 million bonus. Pearson was assigned to the Rookie-level Gulf Coast League Blue Jays, and promoted to the Short Season-A Vancouver Canadians after making one start. Through his first six starts, Pearson did not allow a run, and yielded only four hits and one walk while striking out 16 in 13 total innings. He finished the 2017 regular season with a 0.90 ERA, 26 strikeouts, and a 0.60 WHIP in 20 innings pitched. In early September, Pearson was selected by Vancouver as the starter for the first game of their best-of-three Northwest League playoff series against the Spokane Indians. He went four innings against Spokane and struck out 10 batters in a 2–1 win.

Pearson was assigned to the Advanced-A Dunedin Blue Jays to begin the 2018 season, but opened the year on the disabled list with an oblique injury. He made his Florida State League debut on May 7, but left the game after being struck by a line drive in the second inning. The following day, the team announced Pearson had suffered a broken ulna in his right arm. He remained on the disabled list for the rest of the 2018 season, and played for the Surprise Saguaros of the Arizona Fall League during the offseason. Pearson began 2019 with Dunedin, where he posted a 3–0 record, 0.86 ERA, and 35 strikeouts in 21 innings pitched before being promoted to the Double-A New Hampshire Fisher Cats in early May. He made his Double-A debut on May 7, striking out eight over five scoreless innings. Pearson was named to the 2019 All-Star Futures Game. Pearson was assigned to Triple-A Buffalo on May 3, 2021.

Major leagues 
On July 29, 2020, Pearson made his MLB debut against Max Scherzer and the Washington Nationals. The game was played in Washington despite being a home game for the Blue Jays, as the COVID-19 pandemic had forced the Blue Jays into Sahlen Field in Buffalo, which was not ready for use. He went five innings, giving up two hits and two walks with five strikeouts, and surrendered no runs in his debut, though the Nationals won 4–0. With the 2020 Toronto Blue Jays, Pearson appeared in 5 games, compiling a 1–0 record with 6.00 ERA and 16 strikeouts in 18 innings pitched.

Pearson made 12 appearances for Toronto in 2021, posting a 1-1 record and 4.20 ERA with 20 strikeouts in 15.0 innings pitched. On June 6, 2022, Pearson was placed on the 60-day injured list.

References

External links

Central Florida Patriots bio
FIU Panthers bio

1996 births
Living people
American expatriate baseball players in Canada
Baseball players from Florida
Buffalo Bisons (minor league) players
College of Central Florida Patriots baseball players
Dunedin Blue Jays players
FIU Panthers baseball players
Gulf Coast Blue Jays players
Major League Baseball pitchers
New Hampshire Fisher Cats players
People from Oldsmar, Florida
Surprise Saguaros players
Toronto Blue Jays players
Vancouver Canadians players
American expatriate baseball players in the Dominican Republic
Tigres del Licey players